The AGM-179 Joint Air-to-Ground Missile (JAGM) is an American military program to develop an air-to-surface missile to replace the current air-launched BGM-71 TOW, AGM-114 Hellfire, and AGM-65 Maverick missiles. The U.S. Army, Navy, and Marine Corps plan to buy thousands of JAGMs.

Description
The Joint Air-to-Ground Missile (JAGM) program is a follow-on from the unsuccessful AGM-169 Joint Common Missile program that was cancelled due to budget cuts. JAGM will share basically the same objectives and technologies as JCM but will be developed over a longer time scale.

History
In June 2007 the US Defense Department released a draft request for proposals (RFP) launching a competition for the Joint Air to Ground Missile (JAGM) program. In 2008, Raytheon and Boeing teamed up on a $125 million contract, and Lockheed Martin received a $122 million technology development contract for the Joint Air-to-Ground Missile (JAGM) system.  The 27-month contracts from the U.S. Army's Aviation and Missile Command is for a competitive risk-reduction phase.

Each team submitted its proposal in the spring of 2011, with contract award expected in the first quarter of 2012.  However, in September the Army and Navy requested the JAGM program be terminated.  JAGM survived a budget reduction in 2012 with reduced funding.

In 2012, Lockheed Martin and Raytheon received contracts from the U.S. Army to extend the JAGM technology development program including the design, test, and demonstration phases for the JAGM guidance section.  In 2013, the Army announced it would not award Raytheon a contract for the remainder of the Technology Development (TD) phase and will continue with Lockheed's contract.

In 2015, the Army issued an RFP for a JAGM guidance section upgrade.  Lockheed Martin was to offer its dual-mode laser and millimeter wave radar seeker, and Raytheon may submit its tri-mode seeker which adds imaging infrared if it chooses to compete. Lockheed Martin was awarded a $66 million engineering and manufacturing contract to combine its laser and millimeter wave seekers into the Hellfire Romeo missile body. Raytheon chose not to compete but retains its tri-mode seeker should the Army request it.

The designation AGM-179 was assigned to the JAGM program. A Low-Rate Initial Production (LRIP) contract for JAGM was approved in 2018. The AGM-179A achieved Initial Operational Capability (IOC) with USMC AH-1Z helicopters in early 2022, clearing the weapon for operational deployment.

On 30 August 2022, the JAGM was declared ready for full-rate production. 1,000 missiles had been produced by February 2022, manufacturing at the minimum sustainment rate under low-rate production. Improvements to the JAGM are being developed, such as a medium-range variant with a range of  without changing the missile's dimensions.

On 16 November 2022, Lockheed Martin flight tested the JAGM-Medium Range, or JAGM-MR, which traveled 16 km. The version also incorporates a tri-mode seeker adding an imaging sensor, which was originally a requirement for the missile but was dropped due to cost factors; it was added back in the JAGM-MR as seeker technology became more affordable. Lockheed claims the upgraded capability can be provided at a cost close to the baseline JAGM.

Launch platforms
 AH-64 Apache
 MQ-1C Gray Eagle
 MH-60R/S Seahawk
 MH-60 Black Hawk Defensive Armed Penetrator (DAP)
 AH-1Z Viper
 OH-58F Kiowa
 AH-6 Little Bird
 MQ-9 Reaper
 Lockheed Martin F-35 Lightning II
 Mk 41 Vertical Launching System (through the exls host or with the 3 cell exls)

Operators
:  Selected by UK to equip its AH-64E Apache helicopters.

: The JAGM was intended for joint service with the U.S. Army, U.S. Navy, and the U.S. Marine Corps by providing a single missile configuration for many platforms.  JAGM offered the services increased operational flexibility and reduced logistics support costs.

In February 2012, the Navy and Marine Corps terminated their investment in the program, saying it was a "manageable risk" to do so and that they would instead focus on the GBU-53/B SDB II and continued Hellfire procurement, making the JAGM an Army-only program. In March 2014, they re-entered the program, with documents showing integration of the missile onto Marine AH-1Z helicopters.

The Netherlands: Selected by the Netherlands to equip its AH-64E Apache helicopters.

See also
 Naval Air Systems Command
 List of missiles by country
 Brimstone missile
 Spike (missile)
 Precision Attack Air-to-Surface Missile

References

External links
 Army RDT&E 2009 Budget Item Justification (PDF) 
 Army RDT&E 2010 Budget Item Justification (PDF) 
 U.S. Navy NAVAIR JAGM page
 Lockheed Martin JAGM page
 Raytheon JAGM page
 2012 Army Weapon Systems Handbook - JAGM
 HELLFIRE II Missile

Air-to-surface missiles of the United States
Anti-tank guided missiles of the United States